Night Falls on Manhattan is a 1996 American crime drama film written and directed by Sidney Lumet based on the novel Tainted Evidence by Robert Daley.

The film centers on a newly elected district attorney played by Andy García, who is eager to stamp out corruption within the New York City Police Department. Ian Holm, James Gandolfini, Lena Olin, Ron Leibman and Richard Dreyfuss star in principal supporting roles.

The film was a co-production of Paramount Pictures and Spelling Films. It was commercially distributed by Paramount Pictures theatrically, and by Paramount Home Entertainment for home media. Night Falls on Manhattan explores criminal law, political corruption, and the repercussions of violence. Following its cinematic release, it failed to garner any awards from mainstream organizations for its lead acting or production merits.

Night Falls on Manhattan premiered in U.S. theaters on May 16, 1997 grossing $9,889,670 in domestic ticket receipts. The film saw its widest release in 758 theaters nationwide. Preceding its theatrical run, the film was generally met with mixed to positive critical reviews before its initial screening in cinemas.

Plot
NYPD detectives Liam Casey (Ian Holm) and Joey Allegretto (James Gandolfini) are conducting a surveillance operation against Jordan Washington (Shiek Mahmud-Bey), a notorious drug dealer. On a tip from an informant, they venture into an apartment block where Washington is reported to be hiding. After Casey shoots the lock, Washington fires a submachine gun through his front door, seriously wounding Casey. Police backup units arrive and swarm the building, but Washington executes a cunning escape in an NYPD squad car after killing two cops. In a surprising move, District Attorney Morganstern (Ron Leibman) appoints Casey's son Sean (Andy García), an ex-cop and recently appointed ADA, to prosecute Washington when he is caught. In the process, he passes over the more experienced ADA Elihu Harrison (Colm Feore), who plans to oppose him in an upcoming judicial election.

At Washington's trial, his defense attorney Sam Vigoda (Richard Dreyfuss) does not dispute his client's responsibility for killing the cops but argues that the police were intending to murder Washington. Washington claims that he had been bribing a group of corrupt cops, led by Kurt Kleinhoff, in return for protection while dealing drugs; Vigoda argues that Washington became a target when he refused to match an offer by a rival dealer, Carlos Alvarez, to give the cops more money. Although inexperienced, Sean mounts a strong argument questioning Washington's credibility and wins the case. Washington is sentenced to consecutive life terms without parole. A member of Vigoda's legal team, Peggy Lindstrom (Lena Olin), begins an affair with Sean after the conclusion of the trial. In private, Vigoda discloses to Sean why he undertook Washington's defense: after his 15-year-old daughter died from a drug overdose, Vigoda has been determined to bring down the system of corrupt police enabling the operations of drug-dealers.

After Morganstern suffers a severe heart attack and is unable to run for re-election, Sean is asked to run for D.A. in his place. Sean wins the election over Harrison. Meanwhile, when Kleinhoff's decomposed body is discovered floating in the river, his address book reveals the names of several officers from precincts who responded to the Washington shooting. A number of officers confess their entanglement in the bribery and narcotics scandal. Sean confronts Allegretto, who admits that he took bribes while also colluding to murder Washington with fellow corrupted officers. Allegretto later commits suicide after being confronted by Sean. Casey later discloses to Sean that he forged a judge's signature on Washington's arrest warrant-the original had expired on the day of the raid. Sean asks Morganstern, who is recovering at the hospital, for advice on how to deal with the scandal. Morganstern tells Sean that being D.A. will be a tough job, but he believes Sean "will be better at it than most".

Following a voluntary admission of guilt by Casey about the forgery in a private consultation with Judge Dominick Impelliteri (Dominic Chianese), the judge decides to fill out a new warrant back-dated to the day of the raid which purposely obviates the technicality. He also suggests to Sean that he destroy the original ,forged warrant. Sean tells Vigoda that he plans to resign as D.A., but Vigoda urges him not to quit. Vigoda admits that his motives were to expose police corruption only and that Washington should remain in jail regardless of the fake warrant's origins.The film ends with Casey giving the introductory lecture for a new class of assistant district attorneys; urging them to approach their job with diligence and integrity.

Cast
 Andy García as Sean Casey
 Ian Holm as Liam Casey
 James Gandolfini as Joey Allegretto
 Lena Olin as Peggy Lindstrom
 Richard Dreyfuss as Sam Vigoda
 Shiek Mahmud-Bey as Jordan Washington
 Ron Leibman as Morgenstern
 Colm Feore as Elihu Harrison
 Dominic Chianese as Judge Dominick Impelliteri
 Paul Guilfoyle as McGovern
 Vic Noto as Police Diver Cochran
 Vincent Pastore as Cop #3
 Frank Vincent as Captain
 Bobby Cannavale as Vigoda Assistant #1
 Marcia Jean Kurtz as Eileen (as Marcia J. Kurtz)
 Jude Ciccolella as Lieutenant Wilson
 John Randolph Jones as Captain Lawrence
 Chuck Pfeiffer as Captain Gentile
 Bill Boggs as News #2
 Richard Bright as 64 Precinct Lieutenant
 Jim Moody as Mayor Williams
 Socorro Santiago as Lab Assistant
 Donna Hanover as TV Newsperson #1
 Jack Cafferty as TV Newsperson #3
 Kaity Tong as TV Newsperson #4
 Teddy Coluca as Reporter #1
 Adam Alexi-Malle as Democratic Delegue (uncredited)

Production

Filming
Exterior film shooting took place primarily on location in New York City. Filming sets included the Hotel Pennsylvania, the Sherry Netherland Hotel, Bellevue Hospital Center, and the National Arts Club. The opening scene involving the police shootout with Washington, took place in a desolate apartment building in Harlem. Principal photography for the film began on October 11, 1995 and was completed on December 12. The screenplay for the film written by director Lumet, was based on the novel Tainted Evidence authored by Robert Daley.

According to Lumet, a secondary inspiration for the plot was the true story surrounding the criminal Larry Davis, who escaped arrest from the scene of a drug raid. In the ensuing chaos, Davis shot six NYPD officers and eluded capture for 17 days. The character of Vigoda played by Richard Dreyfuss was patterned after attorney William Kunstler, who defended Davis. The scene of Washington's escape using an NYPD patrol car was staged for dramatic effect. Davis managed to escape the crime scene, but without the use of an actual police car.

Music
The original motion picture soundtrack for Night Falls on Manhattan was not officially released to the public, but features songs composed by veteran musician Wynton Marsalis. The music for the film was orchestrated by Mark Isham, edited by Annette Kudrak and mixed by Stephen Krause, at Capital Studios. The sound effects in the film were supervised by Ron Bochar. The editing of the sound elements was arranged by Glenfield Payne.

Reception

Critical response
The film received mixed to positive reviews. Rotten Tomatoes reported that 69% of 29 sampled critics gave the film a positive review, with an average score of 6.69 out of 10. At Metacritic, which assigns a weighted average out of 100 to critics' reviews, the film received a score of 58 based on 19 reviews. In 1998, actor Andy García was nominated for an ALMA Award, in the category of Outstanding Actor in a Feature Film, for his performance.

Janet Maslin writing in The New York Times, said director Lumet did "a good job of articulating the disillusioning realities of careerism and crime. And he has an ear, as ever, for the disparate voices of the city." She also casually noted that actor Garcia remained "a polite, neutral presence" through "too many moments, particularly during courtroom scenes that have been edited in awkwardly abrupt ways". Roger Ebert in the Chicago Sun-Times referred to the film as "knowledgeable about the city and the people who make accommodations with it. It shows us how boring that obligatory evil kingpin is in so many other crime movies". He explained, it comprises "characters who do wrong and are therefore bad, but it doesn't really have 'villains' in the usual movie sense of the word. It's too smart and grown up for such lazy categories".

In the San Francisco Chronicle, Peter Stack wrote that "The film's setup is intense, full of fearsome action, a pulse-pumper. But soon it becomes a thinking man's police drama about the political aftermath of the botched drug-lord case." Left unmoved, he declared that although "Lumet and his fine cast play it out in a moody, hard-boiled style, Night Falls on Manhattan falls flat. Owen Gleiberman of Entertainment Weekly, said the film unfolds "less in the gritty world of New York law enforcement than in the implausible tabloid imagination of Robert Daley, on whose pulp novel the film is based." He did though positively comment that "Night Falls on Manhattan makes you nostalgic for Lumet's truly first-rate corruption movies, like the great, underrated Q&A (1990)." In a slightly negative tone, Barbara Shulgasser of the San Francisco Examiner thought Lumet's "seriousness and simplicity with which he approaches his subject in Night Falls on Manhattan are refreshing even if the vivacity of the thing never really has a chance to develop."

James Berardinelli of ReelViews viewed the film as being "savvy about a number of things." He claimed that "Not only does it have a good feel for both sides of the police corruption issue, but it's aware of the political rivalries and behind-the-scenes dealmaking that keeps a city running." In his overall summation, he wrote "Sidney Lumet has done something that I wasn't sure was possible in this age of instant, formulaic gratification: make a riveting cop movie without a car chase and a courtroom thriller without cheap theatrics." Adding to the positive sentiment, Kevin Thomas of the Los Angeles Times, said the story was "a string of unlikely events and coincidences" which "set off Night Falls, and Lumet makes them believable the old-fashioned way: through interaction with a screen full of strongly drawn, fully dimensioned, psychologically valid characters."
  
Writing for Time Out, author SGr exclaimed, "Lumet has made 40–odd films, some classic, some lousy. This isn't by any means". He commended how actor "Dreyfuss shines as a radical defence attorney." Not entirely enthusiastic about certain elements of the plot was Andy Klein writing for the Dallas Observer. He flatly wrote, "As satisfying as much of the film is, there are a few missteps, large and small, that may require indulgence on the part of viewers." Describing a lighthearted position on its positive attributes, Mike Clark of USA Today felt "Lumet (who also wrote the script) seems to feed on lousy cop-precinct furniture, political showboating and confrontations between street-savvy adversaries played by synergic actors." On an entirely negative front, Russell Smith of The Austin Chronicle remarked that "Lumet and Daley simply appear to have forgotten everything they once knew about lean, reality-based storytelling—a fact that no amount of bluster, superstar charisma, and stylistic virtuosity can conceal." Smith added, "Expected story developments fail to materialize, and others drop from the blue sky with no apparent rationale. Equally annoying is the film's inability to decide whether it wants to be a conventional melodrama—a view the manically overacting Holm and Ferrer obviously subscribe to—or a dark, nihilistic satire in the vein of other Lumet films such as Network."

Eric Brace of The Washington Post, bluntly commented on the film by writing, "Sidney Lumet mining his familiar territory of corrupt cops and courtroom drama, but if you're hoping he's brought something fresh to the topic of justice in the Big Apple, you'll be disappointed." On a hint of commendation though, he felt "There are plenty of well-filmed scenes of New York in all its glorious grime and decay, and Lumet gives evil a nice touch by having all the bad guys (from drug dealers to corrupt cops to press pool reporters) seeming to always be laughing at some inside joke.". But ultimately he believed "the predictable lesson—that justice isn't cut and dried—clogs the film's gears by the last reel, at least the first half of the movie has some lively story telling."

Incidentally, another Washington Post staff writer couldn't fill in an entirely positive review either. Stephen Hunter commented on Lumet's creative direction saying, "You feel the artist's seriousness of purpose, his passion to know and see and get it right. But it all flounders in a tub with the conventions of potboilers—fictionalized history, sudden wacko plot twists, the radical compression of time, the heavy, oafish hand of coincidence, and characters so wispy they could still be notes on an outline". In a slightly more upbeat tone, Leonard Klady of Variety saw Night Falls on Manhattan as being "a strong addition to an oeuvre that includes  'Serpico,'   'Prince of the City'  and  'Q&A.'  In this story of scandal within the NYPD, the writer-director continues to explore those earlier film's themes of corruption and compromise." He believed "The level of both technical craft and performance is up to the usual high levels associated with the filmmaker." Rating the film with 2 Stars, critic Leonard Maltin sadly wrote that the film "suffers from one major flaw: its central character's naivete. He's constantly shocked by what we in the audience already know—or have guessed." But in positive followup, he pointed out that supporting actor Leibman was "dynamite as the bombastic D.A.."

Box office
The film premiered in cinemas on May 16, 1997 in wide release throughout the U.S.. During its opening weekend, the film opened in a distant 7th place grossing $2,933,255 in business showing at 758 locations. The film The Fifth Element soundly beat its competition during that weekend opening in first place with $11,410,863. The film's revenue dropped by 28% in its second week of release, earning $2,108,268. For that particular weekend, the film fell to 9th place again screening in 758 theaters but not challenging a top five position. The film The Lost World: Jurassic Park, unseated The Fifth Element to open in first place grossing $90,161,880 in box office revenue. The film went on to top out domestically at $9,889,670 in total ticket sales through a 12-week theatrical run. For 1997 as a whole, the film would cumulatively rank at a box office performance position of 119.

Home media
Following its cinematic release in theaters, the film was released in VHS video format on May 5, 1998. The Region 1 Code widescreen edition of the film was released on DVD in the United States on November 17, 1998. Special features for the DVD include; the original theatrical trailer, audio commentary with director Sidney Lumet, actors Andy García and Ron Leibman as well as with producers Josh Kramer and Thom Mount. The disc also includes interactive menus with scene selection. The film was given a Blu-ray Disc release by Australian distributor Imprint Films on August 26, 2020.

See also

Robert Daley

Bibliography

References

External links
 
 
 
 
 
 
 

1996 films
1996 crime drama films
American crime drama films
American courtroom films
Films based on American novels
Films directed by Sidney Lumet
Films scored by Mark Isham
Films about police corruption
Films set in New York City
Films shot in New York City
Paramount Pictures films
Fictional portrayals of the New York City Police Department
Films about the New York City Police Department
Spelling Films films
1990s English-language films
1990s American films